Victor-François Marie Léon, 8th duc de Broglie (25 March 1949, in Paris – 12 February 2012, in Broglie) was a French aristocrat and holder of the title of duc de Broglie.

The duke was born in Paris, the eldest son of Prince Jean de Broglie (1921–1976). He acceded to the ducal title in 1987, after the death of his distant cousin, physicist and Nobel laureate Louis, 7th duc de Broglie, without heirs. His father Jean's great-grandfather, Albert, 4th duc de Broglie, was Louis de Broglie's grandfather, and there was no more senior surviving male.

The duke was active in local politics in the Eure, and served as mayor of the ducal seat of Broglie. He died suddenly in castle of Broglie on 12 February 2012 (Le Figaro, 14 February 2012, p. 15). The duke was unmarried, and his titles were inherited by his younger brother, also unmarried. However, there is another younger brother and several junior cousins, some with young sons.

References

1949 births
2012 deaths
Victor-Francois, duc de Broglie
French politicians